Glen Roy is a river on the Isle of Man where trout may be fished.

References

Glen Roy